Violet Vanbrugh (11 June 1867 – 11 November 1942), born Violet Augusta Mary Barnes, was an English actress with a career that spanned more than 50 years. Despite her many successes, her career was overshadowed by that of her more famous sister, Dame Irene Vanbrugh.

Vanbrugh studied acting and made her professional debut in an 1886 burlesque. The same year, she made her West End theatre debut and then traveled to Margate to play leading roles in four of Shakespeare's plays. In 1889 she joined the Kendals at the Royal Court Theatre and on tour in the US. Two years later, back in London, she joined Henry Irving and Ellen Terry in their famous Shakespeare company at the Lyceum Theatre. In 1893, she appeared opposite her husband Arthur Bourchier at Daly's Theatre and soon became his leading lady at the Royalty Theatre and then at the Garrick Theatre, where Bourchier was lessee for the first six years of the 20th century.

Vanbrugh returned to Shakespearean roles in 1906 at Stratford upon Avon, where she played Lady Macbeth to her husband's Macbeth, and they soon starred together in Herbert Beerbohm Tree's London production of Henry VIII. They continued to play in Shakespeare and other pieces, and two films, through World War I, but their marriage ended in 1918. She continued acting steadily on stage and had some success in film in the 1930s, especially in Pygmalion in 1938. In her 50th season on stage, she starred in The Merry Wives of Windsor with her sister in London, and during The Blitz, they entertained at matinees. Her last film appearance was in 1940 in Young Man's Fancy. She died in London in 1942 at the age of 75.

Biography
Violet Augusta Mary Barnes was born in Exeter, England, the eldest of six children of the Rev Reginald Henry Barnes (1831–1889), Prebendary of Exeter Cathedral and Vicar of Heavitree, and his wife, Frances Mary Emily, née Nation. She was the eldest sister of the actress Irene Vanbrugh and the theatrical educator Kenneth Barnes. She grew up in Exeter and was educated in France and Germany. Although her father was at first dismayed by her interest in the theatre, he eventually gave his consent, and her sister Irene later credited Violet with making her own acting career possible.

Early career

When Violet decided to enter the acting profession, the actress Ellen Terry, a family friend, suggested that she should adopt the stage name Vanbrugh. When Violet's early success encouraged Irene to follow her into the profession, she too took the stage surname Vanbrugh. Both sisters enrolled at Sarah Thorne's school of acting, based at Margate, which gave them a thorough practical grounding. Irene recalled, "We played every kind of play there; comedy, farce, and drama of the deepest dye; while at Christmas there came the pantomime so that the Juliet of a week ago might be the Prince Paragon of the Yule-tide extravaganza." The sisters played together in As You Like It at the Theatre Royal, Margate, with Violet in the lead role, Rosalind, and Irene in the smaller part of Phoebe. John Gielgud, a grand nephew of Ellen Terry, described the two:
The Vanbrugh sisters were remarkably alike in appearance. Tall and imposing, beautifully spoken, they moved with grace. ...They were elegantly but never ostentatiously dressed, entering and leaving the stage with unerring authority. ... Violet never struck me as a natural comedienne, as Irene was.
 
Terry helped Violet Vanbrugh land her first professional acting role in 1886 by introducing her to J. L. Toole, the comic actor and owner of Toole's Theatre in Westminster. The role was a small walk-on part in men's dress, as a member of a chorus of "mashers" in Faust and Loose, a burlesque by F. C. Burnand of Henry Irving's elaborate production of Faust at the Lyceum, which had opened the previous year starring Terry herself as Marguerite. The same year, she made her West End theatre debut as Ellen in The Little Pilgrims. Returning to Margate later that year, she appeared in Shakespeare's Hamlet as Ophelia, in A Midsummer Night's Dream as Helena, in As You Like It as Rosalind and in The Merchant of Venice as Portia. She continued to perform with Toole's company for the next two years, both on tour and in Westminster, playing several roles including Lady Anne in The Butler and Kitty Maitland in The Don, both written by H. C. Merivale and his wife. 

At the Criterion Theatre in London in 1888, she played Gertrude in the Deputy Registrar, a farce by Ralph Lumley and Horace Sedger. The following year, she joined W. H. and Madge Kendal at the Court Theater as Lady Gillingham in The Weaker Sex by A. W. Pinero, and subsequently traveled with them on their first two tours to the US, where, in addition to The Weaker Sex, she played in a variety of other comedies, including John Palgrave Simpson's A Scrap of Paper, Sydney Grundy's A White Lie, and B. C. Stephenson's Impulse, as well as Pinero's drama The Iron Master. After returning to England in 1891, she joined Henry Irving and Ellen Terry at the Lyceum Theatre, playing Anne Boleyn in Irving's successful 1892 revival of King Henry VIII. She also understudied Terry as Cordelia in King Lear and Rosamund in Tennyson's Becket.

Bourchier and later years

In 1893, she appeared together with Arthur Bourchier in Augustin Daly's production of Love in Tandem at Daly's Theatre, and the two married the following year. In 1895, Bourchier became lessee of the Royalty Theatre, and Vanbrugh became his leading lady in many productions, including The Chili Widow, Mr and Mrs, Monsieur de Paris and The Queen's Proctor. Bourchier, Vanbrugh and her sister Irene toured America beginning in 1897. Returning to England, Vanbrugh played the title role in Teresa, which Bourchier produced at the Metropole. After managing several productions with Charles Wyndham, Bourchier became lessee of the Garrick Theatre.

Harold Acton described his childhood impression of Vanbrugh in Memoirs of an Aesthete: "Immensely tall, sedate, angular, sharp-nosed, and dressed as another herbaceous border, she ate her supper haughtily, like a deaconess. I could not imagine...the hero embracing her: unless he were equally tall he would have to climb on a chair." In 1902, Vanbrugh and Bourchier had a child, Prudence Bourchier, who also became an actress, taking the stage name Vanbrugh.

Over the six years of Bourchier's management at the Garrick, Vanbrugh starred in many of his productions, including The Bishop's Move, My Lady Virtue, Whitewashing Julia, The Arm of the Law and W. S. Gilbert's The Fairy's Dilemma (1904). Their production of The Walls of Jericho by Alfred Sutro in 1904, ran for a very successful 423 performances. In 1905, Violet reprised her role of Portia in Bourchier's production of The Merchant of Venice and again in a command performance for King Edward at Windsor Castle. In 1906, at Stratford upon Avon, she played Lady Macbeth to her husband's Macbeth. Vanbrugh and Bourchier toured in 1908 in John Glayde's Honour and appeared together as King Henry and Queen Katherine in Sir Herbert Tree's successful production of Henry VIII, which was followed by Tree's silent film of the play.

In 1913, she appeared in Mrs. Pomeroy's Reputation by Horace Annesley Vachell and Thomas Cobb at The Queen's Theatre. They then produced their own movie in Germany of scenes from Macbeth. They continued to play in Shakespeare and other pieces through World War I, but their marriage was becoming difficult. They toured together in 1916 but then separated and finally divorced in 1918. A contemporary later observed, "He treated her very much as Henry VIII treated Anne Boleyn – except he didn't quite cut off her head." Bourchier remarried a much younger actress, Violet Marion Kyrle Bellew, but Vanbrugh never remarried.

Vanbrugh continued acting steadily until 1939, playing with much success in Thunder in the Air as Mrs Vexted in 1928. She also appeared in three further films during the 1930s, including the 1938 adaptation of Shaw's Pygmalion with Leslie Howard and Wendy Hiller. In her 50th season on stage, she starred in The Merry Wives of Windsor at The Ring Blackfriars (playing Mistress Ford to her sister's Mistress Page), and the Open Air Theatre, Regent's Park. Her last film appearance was in 1940 in Young Man's Fancy. During the Battle of Britain, the Vanbrugh sisters carried out what a biographer calls "a characteristic piece of war work" by giving, with Donald Wolfit, lunchtime performances of extracts from The Merry Wives of Windsor at the Strand Theatre.

Vanbrugh died in London on 11 November 1942 at the age of 75.

References

Sources

Further reading

External links

Photos of Vanbrugh, especially in Shakespeare roles at the Shakespeare and the Players site
NY Times review of Vanbrugh and Bourchier
NPG gallery of portraits of Vanbrugh

English stage actresses
English film actresses
English silent film actresses
1867 births
1942 deaths
20th-century English actresses